The Blues and the Beat is an album by Henry Mancini that won the Grammy Award for Best Large Jazz Ensemble Performance in 1961.

Track listing

Personnel
 Dick Nash, Jimmy Priddy, John Halliburton, Karl De Karske – trombone
 Conrad Gozzo, Frank Beach, Graham Young, Pete Candoli – trumpet
 George Price, Herman Lebow, John Graas, Richard Perissi, Sinclair Lott, Vincent DeRosa – French horn
 Gene Cipriano, Harry Klee, Ronnie Lang, Ted Nash, Wilbur Schwartz – woodwinds
 Larry Bunker – vibraphone
 Victor Feldman – vibraphone, marimba
 Johnny Williams – piano
 Roland Bundock – bass
 Bob Bain – guitar
 Jack Sperling – drums

Production
 Dick Peirce – producer
 Al Schmitt – engineer
 Henry Mancini – liner notes

References

1960 albums
Grammy Award for Best Large Jazz Ensemble Album
Henry Mancini albums
Big band albums
RCA Records albums